Discovery Health Channel was an American subscription television channel. Launched in July 1998, it was owned by Discovery Communications as a spin-off of Discovery Channel, focusing on health and wellness-oriented programming.

In the beginning, DHC's programming consisted of reruns of medical- and health-themed programming from other Discovery networks, particularly TLC. As the network matured, it began producing its own reality series, mostly dealing with babies (Babies: Special Delivery, Birth Day), bodies (Plastic Surgery: Before and After, National Body Challenge), and medicine (The Critical Hour, Dr. G: Medical Examiner). DHC also showed episodes of the CBS medical drama series Chicago Hope on a semi-regular basis. DHC also aired fitness-related programming, most of which later spun off to its sister network FitTV. DHC won its first Daytime Emmy in 2004 for its original series about adoptive families, Adoption Stories.

On January 15, 2008, Discovery announced a joint venture with Oprah Winfrey's Harpo Productions to re-launch Discovery Health as OWN: The Oprah Winfrey Network, in 2009. After multiple delays, OWN officially launched on January 1, 2011, replacing Discovery Health. It was relaunched one month later, merging with FitTV to become Discovery Fit & Health. The network initially took on Discovery Health's programming with FitTV's fitness programming as a complement. It was relaunched in 2015 as Discovery Life, to reflect a generalization of its scope to include life events and family stories.

References

External links

Television channels and stations established in 1998
Television channels and stations disestablished in 2010
English-language television stations in the United States
Defunct television networks in the United States
Warner Bros. Discovery networks